Heitor Amorim Perroca (born 15 February 1940) is a Brazilian former footballer.

References

1940 births
Living people
Brazilian footballers
Association football goalkeepers
Sport Club Corinthians Paulista players
Pan American Games medalists in football
Pan American Games gold medalists for Brazil
Footballers at the 1963 Pan American Games
Medalists at the 1963 Pan American Games